Forty Mile, Fortymile, or variation, may refer to:

Australia 
 Forty Mile, Queensland, a locality in the Shire of Mareeba
 Forty Mile Scrub National Park, park in Queensland

North America 
 Fortymile River, a tributary of the Yukon River in Alaska (USA) and the Yukon (CanadA)

Canada 
Forty Mile, Yukon, a ghost town in Yukon
Fortymile, Yukon; a former community; see List of communities in Yukon
County of Forty Mile No. 8, a municipal district in Alberta

United States 
Forty Mile Point Light, a lighthouse in Michigan
Lahontan Valley, known as the Forty Mile Desert during the era of the California Trail

See also

 
 
 
 Forty (disambiguation)
 Mile (disambiguation)